Immaculate Conception Cathedral is the cathedral mother church for the Roman Catholic Archdiocese of Pondicherry and Cuddalore. It is located in the Union territory of Puducherry.  The  church is also known as Samba Kovil, which is a phonetic corruption of "Saint Paul's Kovil" where "Kovil" means church.

History

The Jesuit Fathers came to the French colony of Pondicherry as missionaries in 1689. There they bought a very large garden to the west of the French Fort. In the 1692 they, with the financial help of Louis XIV, king of France, erected a church which was demolished by the Dutch in the following year. A second Church was quickly built in 1699 but could not last long.

From 1728 to 1736 a large church was built on the site of the present Cathedral. This third church was razed to the ground by the British in 1761 during the Seven Years' War.

Erecting in 1765 provisionally (fourth in serial) a functional kind of irregular shaped shed where the Mission Press (official press depot of the archdiocese) is now, since the year 1770 the Fathers were earnest in building the present cathedral on the foundations of the 3rd Church. On 20 June 1791 the main work was finished and the Church was consecrated by Bishop Champenois. The Bell tower was built later. The choir loft was added in 1905. The Sanctuary was remodeled in the year 1970. The esplanade in front of the Cathedral was remodeled in 1987, to allow people to take part in liturgical ceremonies and special functions held outside.

The Fest of this Church i.e., Immaculate Conception of Blessed Virgin Mary falls on 8 December. Now the church which stands for around 300 years is also the place where the bishop house is also situated. Mass services in Tamil and English are conducted.

It is one of the oldest tourist sites in Puducherry., and was visited by Mother Teresa during her visit to Puducherry.

Gallery

The Church

Statues and Altars in the Church

Cathedral Cemetery

See also
 Roman Catholic Archdiocese of Pondicherry and Cuddalore
 Roman Catholicism in India
 Christianity in India
 Christianity in Puducherry
 List of cathedrals named after the Immaculate Conception of Blessed Virgin Mary
 List of Jesuit sites

References

Roman Catholic cathedrals in India
Roman Catholic churches in Puducherry
Roman Catholic churches completed in 1770
Archdiocese of Pondicherry and Cuddalore
1736 establishments in the French colonial empire
Roman Catholic churches in Pondicherry (city)
18th-century Roman Catholic church buildings in India